Boufarik Airport  is a military airport near Boufarik, Algeria. It is the home base for the Air Transport fleet of the Algerian Air Force.

The based aircraft are Beechcraft 1900, EADS CASA C-295, Lockheed C-130 Hercules and Ilyushin Il-76. It has the 2e Escadre de Transport Tactique et Logistique and the 7e Escadre de Transport Tactique et de Ravitaillement en vol homebased.

History

On , Charles de Gaulle landed at Boufarik airport, flying in from Gibraltar. He would remain based in Algeria until mid-1944 and the Liberation of France.

On 11 April 2018, an Ilyushin Il-76 operated by the Algerian Air Force crashed just after takeoff from this airport, killing about 257 passengers on board.

Notes

External links 
 
 OurAirports - Boufarik

Airports in Algeria
Buildings and structures in Blida Province